John Christian, Duke of Schleswig-Holstein-Sonderburg (Danish: Hans Christian af Slesvig-Holsten-Sønderborg, 26 April 1607 — 30 June 1653) was Duke of Schleswig-Holstein-Sonderburg from 1627 to his death in 1653.

Life 
John Christian was the eldest son of Alexander, Duke of Schleswig-Holstein-Sonderburg and Dorothea, daughter of John Günther I, Count of Schwarzburg-Sondershausen. His father had appointed him to be his successor. However, after his father died, his mother took over the administration of the duchy, and John Christian was forced to pay annual compensation for his brothers. This drew the duchy into deep debt. He died in Sønderborg in 1653, and was succeeded by his son Christian Adolf I.

Marriage and issues 
John Christian married Anna of Oldenburg and Delmenhorst on 4 November 1634. They had the following children:
 Dorothea Augusta (30 September 1636 – 28 February 1662), married George III, Landgrave of Hesse-Itter
 Christine Elisabeth (23 June 1638 – 7 June 1679), married John Ernest II, Duke of Saxe-Weimar
 John Frederick (1639 – 1649), died young
 Christian Adolf (3 June 1641 – 2 January 1702)

References 

1607 births
1653 deaths